Matthew Sayer Gibson was Dean of Brechin from 1964 until 1971.

He was educated at Durham University and ordained in 1941. He was a Curate at St Mary Magdalene, Dundee and then Curate in charge at St Ninian, in the same city. He was then Rector of St Mary Magdalene; Chaplain to the  Bishop of Brechin from 1952 to 1959; and a Canon of Brechin Cathedral from 1956.

Notes

External links 
St. Mary Magdalene Parish History 1952-1977

Scottish Episcopalian clergy
Deans of Brechin
People associated with Dundee
Possibly living people
Year of birth missing
Alumni of St Cuthbert's Society, Durham